The Indiana Medical History Museum is an Indianapolis monument to the beginning of psychiatric medical research. It is located on the grounds of what was formerly Central Indiana Hospital for the Insane, later shortened to Central State Hospital.  It was placed on the National Register of Historic Places on April 25, 1972, as the Old Pathology Building.

It is the United States' oldest surviving pathology laboratory.

History
Central State Hospital administrator George F. Edenharter, who served in the position from 1893 to 1923, decided a building was required for pathology and hired Adolph Scherrer to be the architect of the project. The building was constructed in 1895 and opened as the Pathological Department of Central State Hospital.  When constructed, the two-story brick building was considered "state of the art", with a 150-seat teaching amphitheater, bacteriological and chemical research facilities, and the hospital's morgue. It also contains an anatomical museum, autopsy room, library, mental research laboratories, and a photography room.

The Central College of Physicians and Surgeons and the Medical College of Indiana taught neurology and psychiatry from 1900 to 1908 until both were merged with the Indiana University School of Medicine.  The Indiana University School of Medicine would continue to lecture in the building until 1956. Lecture topics included nervous system development, 'manic-depressive psychosis,' insanity classification, and circulation of the brain and spinal cord. Students from nearby medical colleges traveled to the Old Pathology Building to view autopsies.

Central nervous system syphilis was the most significant subject studied at the building, especially in the 1920s and 1930, because the disease was the specialty of Walter Bruetsch and because the disease was so prevalent in facilities like Central State.  Scientific psychiatry was diminishing in the 1930s, and most similar facilities in the United States closed by the 1940s, but Central State's facility was still being used in 1955.  Most of the buildings of Central State Hospital were in poor condition and were torn down in the 1960s and 1970s.  The old pathology building was still in excellent shape, and all its records remained usable because a few doctors used the buildings in a token manner just to state that it was still in use.  In 1969, the Indiana Medical History Museum was established, using the old pathology building.  Since 1984, the museum has been open to the public at least once a week.

Museum
The Museum is a not-for-profit organization that collects various relics, with over 15,000 by 1994, all related to medical history rather than just pathological items.  A gallery to show rotating themes opened in 1990.

The movie Eight Men Out filmed scenes in the library.

In 2006, the museum received a federal grant through the Indiana Department of Natural Resources of $44,100 to repair the plumbing within the building.

Gallery

See also
List of medical museums
List of attractions and events in Indianapolis

References

External links

Official Flickr
Indiana Medical History Museum - Wishard Scrapbook
Old Pathology Building on National Park Service website

Hospital buildings on the National Register of Historic Places in Indiana
Hospital buildings completed in 1895
Medical museums in the United States
History museums in Indiana
Science museums in Indiana
Museums established in 1969
Museums in Indianapolis
National Register of Historic Places in Indianapolis
Institutions accredited by the American Alliance of Museums